Barbara Palvin (born 8 October 1993) is a Hungarian model. She first appeared in the Sports Illustrated Swimsuit Issue in 2016. In 2019, she became a Victoria's Secret Angel. She is also an Armani Beauty ambassador.

Early life
Palvin was born on 8 October 1993 and raised in Budapest, and often travelled to the countryside to visit her grandmother and great-grandmother. She has an older sister Anita. Her parents Agnes and Bence Palvin owned a shoe business.

Career
When she was 13, she was discovered on the streets of Budapest by a modelling scout while walking with her mother. She shot her first editorial in 2006 for Spur Magazine, and subsequently moved to Asia where she maintained a steady stream of bookings. Since then, Palvin has been on the cover of L'Officiel (France, Italy, Russia, Turkey, Thailand, Singapore), Vogue (Portugal), Marie Claire (Italy, Hungary), Glamour (Hungary, Spain), Elle (Great Britain, Italy, Korea, Brazil, Argentina, Sweden, Serbia, Hungary, Spain, Belgium), Allure, GQ (Portugal), Harper's Bazaar (Australia, Greece, Singapore, South Korea), Jealouse Magazine and Numéro (Netherlands, Russia). Palvin has appeared in campaigns for Armani Exchange, H&M, Victoria's Secret, and Pull & Bear. In February 2012, she became an ambassador for L'Oréal Paris. In 2016, Palvin was revealed to be a part of the Sports Illustrated Swimsuit Rookie Class. She also became the new face of Armani's signature scent "Acqua di Gioia". Palvin is the face of Amazon Fashion and appeared on Express and Chaos advertising campaigns.

Her runway debut was for Prada during Milan Fashion Week in February 2010. Palvin has also walked for Louis Vuitton, Miu Miu, Nina Ricci, Emanuel Ungaro, Christopher Kane, Julien MacDonald, Jeremy Scott, Giles Deacon, Vivienne Westwood, and opened the pre-Fall 2011 Chanel show. In 2012, she walked in the Victoria's Secret Fashion Show. 

Palvin began branching out into acting, after she appeared in the 2014 film Hercules as mythological queen Antimache.

In 2016, she was ranked 4th in Maxim Hot 100. Tumblr's 2017 list of most popular models reported Palvin to be the second most popular model on the social media site.

Palvin returned to the Victoria's Secret Fashion Show in 2018. The next year, she became the first Hungarian Victoria's Secret Angel. Palvin's curves and non-standard runway measurements have been considered by the media to be the brand's direction toward "body positivity".

Public image
Palvin is often compared to Russian model Natalia Vodianova; British Vogue editor Miranda Almond said, "We chose Barbara because she is absolutely exquisite looking, a cross between a young Brooke Shields and Natalia Vodianova". Palvin credits Vodianova and Kate Moss as her favorite models.

Personal life
Since 2018, Palvin has been in a relationship with American actor Dylan Sprouse. They resided in Brooklyn until 2021, when they moved to Los Angeles.

Filmography

References

External links

 
 

1993 births
Living people
21st-century Hungarian actresses
Hungarian female models
Hungarian film actresses
IMG Models models
Models from Budapest
Victoria's Secret Angels
Hungarian expatriates in the United States